Harry William Phillips (born 19 September 1997) is an English professional footballer who plays as a midfielder for Southend United.

Career
In March 2014, Phillips made his under-18 debut for Southend United after initially joining the club in 2007. 

On 9 November 2019, Phillips made his only appearance on loan for Billericay Town in a 4–0 FA Cup loss against Forest Green Rovers. 

On 28 January 2020, Phillips made his debut for Southend, scoring in a 3–1 defeat against Doncaster Rovers.

Career statistics

References

1997 births
Living people
Association football midfielders
English footballers
People from Wickford
English Football League players
Southend United F.C. players
Billericay Town F.C. players